The FMA AeC.3 was a light utility aircraft built in Argentina in 1934; a further development in the series of designs that had originated with the AeC.1 three years previously. Deliveries to Argentina's aeroclubs were made late in the year.

Development
Like its immediate predecessor, the AeC.2, the AeC.3 was an open-cockpit variant of the family, and was distinguished mainly in its use of an Armstrong Siddeley Genet Major engine. 

On 21 January 1936, a refined version flew as the AeC.3G. The main innovation introduced on this aircraft was the use of flaps, the first Argentine aircraft to be so equipped. This aircraft first flew as an open-cockpit type, but later had a roof fitted to create an enclosed cabin.

A further development, the last in this family of aircraft, was the AeC.4 that flew on 17 October. This was essentially an AeC.3G with improved aerodynamics and only a single example was built.

Operational history
In 1935, Carola Lorenzini set a South American altitude record of 5,500 m (18,040 ft) in an AeC.3, and another aircraft of this type was flown by Santiago Germanó to win the aerobatics prize at the Resistencia air meet the same year. A final feat for the AeC.3 for 1935 was its use by Pedro B. Mórtola in a long-distance round-trip flight between Buenos Aires and Rio Gallegos, covering  in 37 hours 20 minutes.

Variants
 AeC.3 – version powered by Armstrong Siddeley Genet Major engine
 AeC.3G – AeC.3 powered by de Havilland Gipsy Major engine, and fitted with flaps
 AeC.4 – AeC.3G with improved aerodynamics

Specifications (AeC.3)

References

External links

1930s Argentine civil utility aircraft
FMA aircraft